Grønnåsen Church is a parish church of the Church of Norway in Tromsø Municipality in Troms og Finnmark county, Norway. It is located in the Breivika area in the northern part of the city of Tromsø on the island of Tromsøya. It is the church for the Grønnåsen parish which is part of the Tromsø domprosti (arch-deanery) in the Diocese of Nord-Hålogaland. The gray, wooden church was built in a fan-shaped style in 1996 using designs drawn up by the architects E. Hallset and K. Ragnarsdottir. The church seats about 450 people.

See also
List of churches in Nord-Hålogaland

References

Churches in Tromsø
Churches in Troms
Wooden churches in Norway
20th-century Church of Norway church buildings
Churches completed in 1996
1996 establishments in Norway
Fan-shaped churches in Norway